Estádio Municipal de Rio Maior is a multi-use stadium in Rio Maior, Portugal.  It is currently used mostly for football matches and is the home stadium of UD Rio Maior. The stadium is able to hold 3,550 people and opened in 2003. It served as the home stadium for Sporting B in their first season, before moving to Alcochete. U.D. Vilafranquense hosted games at the ground in their debut LigaPro season in 2019–20, due to the inadequate facilities at their own ground.

References

Municipal de Rio Maior
Buildings and structures in Santarém District
Sport in Rio Maior
Buildings and structures in Rio Maior
Sports venues completed in 2003